Doctor Geek's Laboratory is an audio show created by Dr. Scott Viguié that operates as STEM outreach (Science, Technology, Engineering, and Math) and is used by some homeschooling parents as part of their science curriculum. The show portrays a fictional laboratory populated by humorous characters who are trying to bring about the world of tomorrow today. Most of the episodes include a non-fiction element by interviewing scientists, corporate leaders, and others who are actively working on bleeding edge technology and trying to bring it to the consumer. The first season of the show is available as a box set from Blackstone Audio.

Characters
 Doctor Geek played by Dr. Scott Viguié
 Mister Flask played by Chris Harrington
 DEUS-X played by Calliope Collacott
 Madame Oracle played by Calliope Collacott
 Mister Creature played by Sacha Dzuba and Phil Harrington
 Claire played by NYT Bestselling Author Debbie Viguié 
 Rick played by Star Mage comic creator JC De La Torre
 Sam played by Rita De La Torre

Science Fair
Doctor Geek's Laboratory has done live episodes and presentations at many libraries and conventions.  The lab hosted its first annual science fair in September 2014 at the South Florida Museum.

References

External links
 

Science education